Joseph McLean Hall Jr. is a professor, writer, and historian at Bates College in Lewiston, Maine where he specializes in early modern American and Atlantic history, particularly focusing on Native American, European, and environmental interactions in North America. He is a nationally recognized historian for his research in Native American history and in addition to his work in academia, he often writes articles that contribute to newspapers and gives presentations to public audiences. Hall is currently working on a book project concerning the Maine Coast and the Bates-Morse Mountain Conservation Area in collaboration with Bates faculty in the natural sciences. He is an associate professor at Bates in the History department and the Environmental Studies (ES) program, having recently chaired the ES program and multiple hiring committees for new ES faculty. He also received the 2009 Kroepsch Award for Excellence in Teaching and the honor of delivering the 2018 Convocation Address at Bates.

Hall is originally from Newport, Rhode Island and received his B.A. at Amherst College (1991) and his M.A. (1995) and Ph.D. (2001) at the University of Wisconsin–Madison. He is the author of many articles, essays, and popular books including Zamumo’s Gifts: Indian-European Exchange in the Colonial Southeast (2012) and Making an Indian People: Creek Formation in the Colonial Southeast, 1590-1735 (2001). His works have been positively reviewed and cited in peer-reviewed journals such as The Journal of Southern History, The Florida Historical Quarterly, The William and Mary Quarterly, and Maine History.

Hall focuses on teaching rather than research and offers a diversity of courses at Bates, many of which are cross-listed in the Africana, American Studies, and/or Environmental Studies programs.

Current Courses
African Slavery in the Americas
Historical Methods
Native American History
New England: Environment and History
Origins of New Nations, 1500-1820
The Revolutionary Black Atlantic, 1770-1840
This Land is Whose Land?
U.S. Environmental History
Wabanaki History in Maine

References

External links
Faculty profile

Bates College faculty
Amherst College alumni
University of Wisconsin–Madison alumni
Living people
21st-century American historians
21st-century American male writers
Historians of the United States
Year of birth missing (living people)
Writers from Newport, Rhode Island
American male non-fiction writers
Historians from Rhode Island